Darren Burns (born 17 May 1974) is an Australian former rugby league footballer who played as a  for the Western Suburbs Magpies, South Sydney Rabbitohs, Sydney Roosters and the Brisbane Broncos over his seven-year career in the Australian National Rugby League competition.

Background
Burns was born in Dalby, Queensland and played his junior rugby league for the Dalby Devils.

Playing career
He is best remembered for his part in helping Warrington Wolves escape relegation in 2002, and in particular his performance in the 29–14 victory over Castleford Tigers at Wilderspool.

References

External links
Darren Burns Official NRL Profile
broncos.com.au

1974 births
Living people
South Sydney Rabbitohs players
Sydney Roosters players
Brisbane Broncos players
Warrington Wolves players
Rugby league centres
Rugby league second-rows
Rugby league locks
Rugby league players from Queensland
Western Suburbs Magpies players